Lucy is an unincorporated community in Houston County, Alabama, United States.

History
A post office operated under the name Lucy from 1903 to 1908.

The Lucy soil series is named for the community.

References

Unincorporated communities in Houston County, Alabama
Unincorporated communities in Alabama